Mary Frances Spear (11 September 1913 – 10 April 2006) was an English cricketer who played as a right-handed batter and right-arm medium bowler. She appeared in four Test matches for England between 1934 and 1935, including the first women's Test in history. She played domestic cricket for West of England.

References

External links
 
 

1913 births
2006 deaths
Sportspeople from Bath, Somerset
England women Test cricketers
West women cricketers